The 2003 elections to West Dunbartonshire Council were held on the 1 May 2003 and were the third to the unitary authority, which was created along with 28 other local authorities, under the Local Government etc (Scotland) Act 1994. They were also the last held under the single-member constituency first past the post system, which was replaced in the 2007 election with Single Transferable Vote.

Election results

Ward results

References

External links

2003 Scottish local elections
2003
21st century in West Dunbartonshire